The Green Party of Iraq was created in 2003 and is dedicated to build an Iraq that is committed to "democracy, justice, and freedom" and one that respects equal rights for all Iraqis, irrespective of "religion, sect, or ethnicity".  The political party does not have any elected members in the Council of Representatives of Iraq.

Platform
The Green Party of Iraqi has sixteen core values, similar to the Global Greens ten key values.

1. Democracy.
2. Unity of Iraq.
3. Constitution committed to justice and equality for all.
4. Free and Just Multi-Party Elections.
5. Protecting Islam, while respecting religious freedom.
6. Economy that provides for a dignified life.
9. Army and the Armed Forces that follows civilian and constitutional law.
10. Right Medicare, Social and Educational Welfare.
11. Respect for Iraqi diverse Culture and National Heritage. 
12. Respect for Kurdish and Ethnic Minority Rights.
13. Respect for Farmers and Workers Rights. 
14. Respect for Human rights and punishment for those that violate these rights.
15. Freedom of the Press, Publication and Information.

References
Green Party of Iraq

2003 establishments in Iraq
Defunct political parties in Iraq
Green parties in Asia
Political parties established in 2003
Political parties with year of disestablishment missing